Justice Peck may refer to:

Asahel Peck (1803–1879), associate justice of the Vermont Supreme Court
E. Woolsey Peck (1799–1888), chief justice of the Alabama Supreme Court
Jacob Peck (1779–1869), associate justice of the Tennessee Supreme Court
John Weld Peck II (1913–1993), associate justice of the Supreme Court of Ohio
Louis P. Peck (1918–2008), associate justice of the Vermont Supreme Court
William Virgil Peck (1804–1877), associate justice of the Supreme Court of Ohio
William Ware Peck (1821–1897), justice of the Territorial Wyoming Supreme Court

See also
Judge Peck (disambiguation)